Dechlorane may refer to:

Mirex, an obsolete insecticide, sometime sold under the name dechlorane
Dechlorane plus, an organochlorine flame retardant